The Mahab Al Shimaal, is a horse race for horses aged three and over, run at a distance of 1,200 metres (six furlongs) on dirt in March at Meydan Racecourse in Dubai.

The Mahab Al Shimaal was first contested in 2001 on dirt at Nad Al Sheba Racecourse. It was moved to Meydan in 2010 where it was run on a synthetic Tapeta surface until reverting to dirt in 2015.

Records
Record time:
 1:09.59 - Diabolical 2008

Most successful horse:
 3 - Conroy 2002, 2003, 2004

Most wins by a jockey:
 2 - Frankie Dettori 2004, 2010
 2 - Kerrin McEvoy 2003, 2008
 2 - Richard Mullen 2005, 2013
 2 - Ryan Moore 2007, 2011

Most wins by a trainer:
 3 - Saeed bin Suroor 2008, 2009, 2010
 3 - Adi Selvaratnam 2002, 2003, 2004

Most wins by an owner:
 3 - Mohammed Al Jamali 2002, 2003, 2004
 3 - Godolphin 2008, 2009, 2010

Winners

See also
 List of United Arab Emirates horse races

References

Open sprint category horse races
Horse races in the United Arab Emirates
Recurring sporting events established in 2001
2001 establishments in the United Arab Emirates